Sihigali is a 2010 Indian Kannada-language drama film directed and written by Lekhan. The film stars Sriimurali and Sherin, with Thulasi Shivamani and Sharan in supporting roles.

Cast 
Sriimurali as Dharani
Sherin as Jeevi
Thulasi Shivamani
Sharan
Achyuth Kumar

Production
Debutant director Lekhan opted to make his first film and chose to focus on the mother-son relationship. Actress Sherin made a comeback after a brief absence from acting through the project, and shot for forty days.

Soundtrack

Reception

Critical response 

Shruti Indira Lakshminarayana of Rediff.com scored the film at 1 out of 5 stars and says "Dialogues, especially those between the just smitten Dharni and Jeevi, are too poetic to digest. Sharan, who plays Murali's friend, also fails to impress. Stale jokes find a place in the film and there is nothing even Sharan can do to make them sound funny. Sihigalli is sure to give you a headache. Give it a miss". BSS from Deccan Herald wrote "Normal situations tend to turn syrupy while those that need to be tightened are cut a huge slack. Neither Niranjan Babu’s camerawork nor the music can make this “gaali”, a “sihigaali”. A prodigal waste". A critic from Bangalore Mirror wrote  "Leykkhan messes with the film and the producer’s money big time. If you don’t want to do the same with your time, keep a safe distance from Sihigaali. It is a gasbag and smells bad". Sify.com wrote "Lekhan's brainless narrative fails to bring even decent performance from talented artists like Sri Murali, Thualsi Shivamani and Sharan. Shirin is wasted. However Murali shines in a few action sequences. It is better to avoid 'Sihi Gaali' ".

References 

2010 films
2010s Kannada-language films
2000s Kannada-language films